Cryptops australis is a species of centipede in the Cryptopidae family. It was first described in 1845 by British entomologist George Newport. It occurs in Australia and New Zealand.

Description
These small centipedes grow to about 3 cm in length. They inhabit wet forests, where they are found underneath and within rotting logs. Their colouration is orange-brown. They are blind and have 21 pairs of legs.

References

 

 
australis
Centipedes of Australia
Fauna of New South Wales
Fauna of Victoria (Australia)
Centipedes of New Zealand
Animals described in 1845
Taxa named by George Newport